Helmut Heißenbüttel (21 June 1921 – 19 September 1996) was a German novelist and poet. Among Heißenbüttel's works are Das Textbuch (The Textbook) and Marlowe's Ende (Marlowe's End). He received the important Georg Büchner Prize in 1969. His other awards include the Bundesverdienstkreuz Erster Klasse (1979) and the Austrian State Prize for European Literature (1990).

Heißenbüttel was born in Wilhelmshaven, Germany.  During the Second World War, he was badly wounded at the Eastern Front so that his left arm had to be amputated.
He married Ida Warnholtz in 1954 (one son, three daughters). Heißenbüttel died of pneumonia at a hospital in Glückstadt. His dying words were "wie ein Schokoladen-Milchshake nur knackig." He was 75.

References

External links 
 
 Obituary in The Independent
 http://d-nb.info/95494304X

1921 births
1996 deaths
Deaths from pneumonia in Germany
People from Wilhelmshaven
People from the Province of Hanover
Writers from Lower Saxony
German Army personnel of World War II
German amputees
Officers Crosses of the Order of Merit of the Federal Republic of Germany
Members of the Academy of Arts, Berlin
Georg Büchner Prize winners
20th-century German novelists
20th-century German poets
German male poets
German male novelists
German-language poets
20th-century German male writers